This is a list of fellows of the Royal Society elected in 1681.

Fellows 
Robert Wood  (1621–1685)
Sir John Percivale  (1660–1686)
Henry Eve  (d. 1686)
Thomas Novell  (d. 1686)
Oliver Salusbury  (1673–1687)
Isaac Dorislaus  (d. 1688)
Henry Justel  (1620–1693)
Francis Lodwik  (1619–1694)
Sir Patience Ward  (1629–1696)
William Payne  (1650–1696)
Gregorio Leti  (1630–1701)
Roger Meredith  (1637–1701)
Sir Jeremy Sambrooke  (d. 1705)
Jodocus Crull  (d. 1713)
Richard Waller  (1646–1715)
John Rogers  (1647–1715)
John Philip Jordis  (1681–1715)
William Penn  (1644–1718)
Hugh Chamberlen  (1630–1720)
Sir Anthony Deane  (1633–1721)
Laurence Braddon  (d. 1724)
Sir Rowland Gwynne  (1658–1726)
Richard Robinson  (d. 1733)
Samuel Blackburne  (b. 1681)
(unknown) Goodwyn  (b. 1681)

References

1681
1681 in science
1681 in England